Sindangratu is a village in the Garut Regency, West Java province, Indonesia. This village has a population of 6542 according to the 2010 census.

References

 Census Results (2010), Badan Pusat Statistics, Population_of_Indonesia_by_Village

Sindangratu